Shir Khun (also Romanized as Shīr Khūn; also known as Shīr Khān) is a village in Safaiyeh Rural District, in the Central District of Zaveh County, Razavi Khorasan Province, Iran. At the 2006 census, its population was 150, in 35 families.

References 

Populated places in Zaveh County